Ghost Town Heart is the debut album of Canadian alt-country/folk singer Lee Mellor, produced by Paul Johnston and Lee Mellor.  It was officially released in Toronto on August 18, 2007, and on September 7 in Montreal.  The album has been praised for its lyrics in both the independent and mainstream media.

Track listing
All songs written by Lee Mellor
 "Liberty Street" – 4:21
 "The Greatest Killer in a Small Town" – 3:08
 "Nowhere, Manitoba" – 5:43
 "Gravedigger Blues" – 3:50
 "Girl on the Highway" – 6:00
 "Ain't No Whiskey" – 3:53
 "St. Lawrence River" – 6:06
 "Bar Mirror" – 4:18
 "Big Rusty Hammer" – 4:33
 "Tumbleweed" – 2:20
 "Jessie Hynes" – 2:27
 "Blow My Heart Out of the Night" – 4:23
	

2007 debut albums
Lee Mellor albums